Njombe Mjini is an administrative ward in the Njombe Urban District, in the Njombe Region of southern Tanzania.

Description
The ward represents the central downtown area of the City of Njombe. The city is the capital of the Njombe Region, in the Tanzanian Southern Highlands

The Njombe Mjini ward's population was 42,180 in the 2002 Tanzanian census.

References

Wards of Njombe Region